

Principle
Simmons' citrate agar is used for differentiating gram-negative bacteria on the basis of citrate utilization. It is useful for selecting for organisms that use citrate as its main carbon and energy source. It is a defined, selective and differential medium that tests for an organism's ability to use citrate as a sole carbon source and ammonium ions as the sole nitrogen source.

The medium contains sodium chloride, sodium citrate, ammonium dihydrogen phosphate, dipotassium phosphate, and magnesium sulphate. It also contains bromothymol blue, a pH indicator. Bromothymol blue is green at pH below 6.9, and then turns blue at a pH of 7.6 or greater.

Physical Format
Although it could be used in other formats (e.g., Petri plates), Simmons' citrate agar is often used in slants.

Interpretation
Organisms growing on Simmons' citrate agar are capable of using citrate as the sole carbon source and they can metabolize the ammonium salt in the medium (serving as a sole nitrogen source for growth).

Use of citrate results in the creation of carbonates and bicarbonates as byproducts. Organisms degrading citrate must also use the ammonium salts, producing ammonia, thus increasing the pH of the medium. The increase in pH then causes color change in the bromothymol blue indicator, turning it blue. Under neutral conditions the medium remains a green color. The color change to blue is useful because growth on Simmons' citrate agar is often limited and would be hard to observe if it were not for the color change.

Sometimes, it is possible to detect growth on the Simmons' citrate agar without the accompanying color change to blue. This should be scored as a negative for the citrate use test.
Bacteria such as Salmonella and Providencia develop on such mediums.

References

External links
 ASM MicrobeLibrary article "Citrate Test Protocol"

Microbiological media